Andy Miller (born February 3, 1978) is an American professional golfer.

Miller was born in Napa, California. He is the son of former PGA Tour golfer Johnny Miller. He played college golf at Brigham Young University where he was a four-time All-American. He played on the 2000 U.S. Palmer Cup team. He turned professional in 2000. 

Miller played on the Buy.com Tour (now Korn Ferry Tour) in late 2002 on sponsor's exemptions and by Monday-qualifying. He won the State Farm Open after Monday-qualifying, earning a tour card for the remainder of the year. He then earned his 2003 PGA Tour card at Q School. His best finish on the PGA Tour was a T-31 at the 2003 B.C. Open.

Professional wins (1)

Buy.com Tour wins (1)

Buy.com Tour playoff record (1–0)

U.S. national team appearances
Palmer Cup: 2000

See also
2002 PGA Tour Qualifying School graduates

References

External links

American male golfers
BYU Cougars men's golfers
PGA Tour golfers
Golfers from California
People from Napa, California
1978 births
Living people